Zsolt Erdei (born 31 May 1974) is a Hungarian former professional boxer who competed from 2000 to 2014. He held world championships in two weight classes, including the WBO and lineal light-heavyweight titles from 2004 to 2009 (making eleven consecutive defences against ten different opponents), and the WBC cruiserweight title from 2009 to 2010. Erdei is the first boxer from Hungary to win world titles in two weight divisions. As an amateur, he won a bronze medal in the middleweight division at the 2000 Olympics. He also competed at the 1996 Summer Olympics.

Amateur career
 1997 World Champion in Budapest
 1998 and 2000 European Champion
 Representing Hungary, won the Middleweight bronze medal at the 2000 Olympics in Sydney
 Amateur Record: 212-20
1996 Olympic Results
Defeated Juan Pablo López (Mexico) RSC 3 (2:20)
Lost to Malik Beyleroğlu (Turkey) 8-9
2000 Olympic Results - Boxed as a Middleweight (75 kg)
Defeated Vladislav Vizilter (Kyrgyzstan) RSC-3
Defeated Alexander Zubrikhin (Ukraine) 14-9
Lost to Gaydarbek Gaydarbekov (Russia) 16-24

Professional career

Erdei turned professional in December 2000 and won the WBO Inter-Continental light heavyweight title in October 2002. On January 17, 2004, Erdei won the Lineal and WBO light heavyweight titles from Julio César González by unanimous decision, and successfully defended the titles eleven times.

On November 13, 2009, he relinquished his WBO light heavyweight title and moved up to cruiserweight. Erdei defeated  Giacobbe Fragomeni on November 21, 2009, for the WBC cruiserweight title. Most of Erdei's matches during his professional career were promoted by Universum boxing.

After announcing his retirement in January 2010 and thus relinquishing his claim as Lineal light heavyweight champion, Erdei decided to have more matches in 2011 in the USA  and fought Samson Onyango and Byron Mitchell as his first opponents there. The Mitchell fight which was set up by Lou DiBella ended with Erdei knocking Mitchell out in the 6th round (TKO).

Erdei finally returned on March 30, 2013 and lost a 10 round split decision to Denis Grachev.

Professional boxing record

References

External links
 (archived)

Zsolt Erdei profile at Cyber Boxing Zone

1974 births
Living people
World Boxing Organization champions
Boxers at the 1996 Summer Olympics
Boxers at the 2000 Summer Olympics
Olympic bronze medalists for Hungary
Olympic boxers of Hungary
Boxers from Budapest
Olympic medalists in boxing
AIBA World Boxing Championships medalists
Hungarian male boxers
Medalists at the 2000 Summer Olympics
World light-heavyweight boxing champions
World cruiserweight boxing champions
I'm a Celebrity...Get Me Out of Here! winners